Jim Donini (born July 23, 1943) is an American rock climber and alpinist, noted for a long history of cutting-edge climbs in Alaska and Patagonia. He was president of the American Alpine Club from 2006 to 2009, and a 1999 recipient of the AAC's Robert and Miriam Underhill Award.

Notable climbs
 1976 Torre Egger - First Ascent - with John Bragg, and Jay Wilson from the United States, by climbing first to the col between the Egger and Cerro Torre, the Col of Conquest, and then up the ridge to the peak.  The ascent was hampered by bad weather and took from December 1975 to February 22, 1976 when the 3-person team summitted.
 1978 North Ridge on Latok I, Karakorum Range, Pakistan.  Attempt with Michael Kennedy, George Lowe and Jeff Lowe (climber) (all USA).
 1991 Cobra Pillar on the east face of Mount Barrille, Ruth Gorge, Alaska Range, Alaska, USA (VI 5.10+ A3 WI5? 2300m) FA with Jack Tackle (USA), June 5–10, 1991.
 1991 Viper Ridge, south spur of southeast ridge to ridge, Mount Foraker, Alaska Range, Alaska USA.  FA with Jack Tackle (USA), June 11–17, 1991.
2000 Lightning Spur, south face Thunder Mountain, Alaska Range, Alaska USA. FA with John Bragg (USA).

References

Living people
1943 births
Sportspeople from Philadelphia
American mountain climbers